"A Smile and a Ribbon" is a song with music by Mark McIntyre and lyrics by Robert Wells. It was recorded by 1950s music act Patience and Prudence (McIntyre's daughters). It appeared as the B-side of the single "Tonight You Belong to Me" in 1956.

The song is featured in the graphic novel Ghost World and its film adaptation. It is main character Enid Coleslaw's missing piece of childhood memorabilia, although the story depicts "A Smile and a Ribbon" as the main single. The song was also featured in a National Lottery advertisement in the UK, and on the ABC Family TV show Bunheads, season 1, episode 18 ("Next"), which aired on 25 February 2013.

1956 songs